Alex McDowell, RDI (born 11 April 1955) is a British narrative designer and creative director.

McDowell is a designer working in narrative media. He is a strong advocate of world building and immersive design and integrates digital technology and traditional design technique in his work. He has created a holistic design process that incorporates ideation, inception, prototyping, and production for tangible story worlds.

Early work
Alex McDowell was born in Borneo, to British parents. His father, H Blair McDowell, was an engineer for Royal Dutch Shell, and his brother, Jonathan McDowell, is a London-based architect at Matter. He attended Quaker boarding schools from age 7 to 18.

McDowell wanted to become a painter from an early age, and studied fine art at the Central School of Art and Design in London where in 1975 he and Sebastian Conran staged the Sex Pistols first headline concert. The consequent immersion into the London punk scene led to designing and printing T-shirts for Malcolm McLaren and Vivienne Westwood's legendary King's Road shop Sex. With musician Glen Matlock, he founded graphic studio Rocking Russian Design in 1978, which is where Neville Brody started his career. McDowell designed album covers for punk rock groups and a wide variety of musicians including  Rich Kids, Siouxsie and the Banshees, The Clash, and Iggy Pop.

In 1979, McDowell was commissioned to design Pop's Soldier album. Iggy asked him to make his first three music videos for Soldier, and so, a year before the launch of MTV, and knowing very little about the role, McDowell became a production designer. In 1981 he co-founded design studio Da Gama, alongside typographer and designer John Warwicker, the first studio in London to simultaneously art direct record sleeves and art direct/direct videos for bands. He began to work with director Tim Pope, designing a famous series of videos for The Cure, among many others. Pope and McDowell traveled widely with many bands, making a video with Depeche Mode at the Berlin Wall, with Queen in Munich, and Neil Young in California. Gradually his production design work overtook his work as graphic designer until in 1986 he moved permanently to Los Angeles to work in the burgeoning music video and commercials industry in Hollywood.

During the late 1980s and 1990s, he designed the sets for over one hundred music videos including artists like Madonna, Michael Jackson, ZZ Top, Aerosmith and others. He moved from production company Limelight, where he designed and directed music videos, including "Paradise" (1988) for Nigerian singer Sade, to the prolific Propaganda Films, co-owned by director David Fincher. McDowell worked for a solid year with Fincher, seven days a week, designing sets for Madonna's videos "Express Yourself", "Oh Father" and "Vogue" amongst many others, and commercials for companies like Levi's, Converse, Nike, Pepsi, Revlon, Sony, Coca-Cola, and Chanel.

As the young video and commercial directors that McDowell was working with started to attract feature producers, McDowell too was pulled towards film. His first feature was also the first to feature virtual reality, The Lawnmower Man. Back at Propaganda Films, his work was seen by director Alex Proyas who asked him to design The Crow (1994), an independent fantasy action film starring Brandon Lee, which opened at the top of the box office and went on cult status.

Filmography

Production design
Beginning with The Crow in 1994, McDowell began to production design features back-to-back, working with directors like Terry Gilliam (Fear and Loathing in Las Vegas, 1998), and again with David Fincher for one of the most controversial films of 1999, Fight Club. In 1999, he was asked by Steven Spielberg to design Minority Report. This film, which began with no script and involved two separate pre-production design phases, provoked McDowell to develop a new design methodology that built a holistic world for the narrative, within which the script evolved, and created the first fully digital art department. When the film released in 2002, it was noted for its deep attention to the detail, and the reality of this future world. In addition, it became apparent that the visionary technologies that grew from the world and became part of the landscape of the film one by one became realized in the real-world. From the experience during the film and observation of its long-term world-facing outcomes McDowell developed a narrative design practice known as world building, which continues to be the basis of his creative practice. As a concrete example of the design fiction influence of the film John Underkoffler, who had acted as science advisor and collaborator with McDowell for the art-science of film's design had built a start-up, Oblong Industries, to produce systems using gesture modeled on the fictional ideas that he proposed in the world build of the film.

The Lawnmower Man (1992)
The Crow (1994)
Crying Freeman (1995)
Fear (1996)
The Crow: City of Angels (1996)
Fear and Loathing in Las Vegas (1998)
Fight Club (1999)
The Affair of the Necklace (2001)
Minority Report (2002)
The Cat in the Hat (2003)
The Terminal (2004)
Charlie and the Chocolate Factory (2005)
Corpse Bride (2005)
Breaking and Entering (2006)
Bee Movie (2007)
Watchmen (2009)
Fantastic Mr. Fox (2009) (visual consultant)
Rise of the Guardians (2012) (visual consultant)
Upside Down (2012)
Man of Steel (2013)

Production
Bunraku (2010) (co-producer)

World building

As opposed to World building in interactive and multi-player games, the world building practice as initiated by McDowell in 2000 describes a narrative design system capable of addressing massively complex challenges in both fictional and real-world scenarios. World building is the engine that initiates each output. The practice that McDowell launched upturned the cinematic tradition of linear storytelling that conventionally springs from a funded script or a client brief. In world building a world is developed as a container for multiple narratives. Each world is developed in cross-disciplinary collaboration and expertise, distributing broad research to a holistic knowledge-base known as a Mandala, which leads to further research, culminating in multiple narratives. This helps organizations to envision, design, and experience preferred futures.

Current work
Experimental.design is a multi-platform, cross-discipline narrative design studio at the forefront of World Building. Led by McDowell, every project and partnership begins with the creation of a world. In April 2015, McDowell was awarded the BritWeek Business Innovation Award.

McDowell currently serves as a professor of cinema practice at the University of Southern California. McDowell was named the William Cameron Menzies endowed chair in Production Design in 2014.

World Building Media Lab
In addition to teaching world building, he directs the USC World Building Media Lab (WbML), where McDowell and his interdisciplinary students engage in funded research to build immersive worlds for storytelling and vast collaboration for synchronous media technologies. In 2014, the research lab was awarded the prestigious Future Voice Award at the Interaction Awards. The lab is engaged in an ongoing research project to develop a new visual language for molecular biology and the biological sciences, expressed in the World in a Cell, development of an immersive virtual reality experience of the interior of a single Pancreatic Beta Cell. In a funded partnership with the USC Bridge Institute, the project aims to create outcomes that include high school and undergraduate teaching platforms, public-facing exhibitions, and a tool for scientific investigation and collaboration.

World Building Institute
In October 2008, McDowell founded the World Building Institute. The preeminent knowledge space for designers and creators in cross-platform narrative media, the Institute provides opportunities for creative thinkers across multiple disciplines to explore how world building and narrative design can be applied in broad contexts. Current members include: François Audouy, Christopher Bailey, Wolfgang Bergmann, Jim Bissell, John Seely Brown, Rick Carter, Chris Defaria, Dr. Syliva Earle, Scott Fisher, Terry Jones, Ann Pendleton-Jullian, Yuval Sharon, among many others.

From 2007 to 2016 the World Building Institute hosted the Science of Fiction Festival every eighteen months. Centered around how creativity and art-science projects affect the human experience, the event reached upwards of 300 participants each year, from corporate leaders to youth from 6–16. In 2014, the practice-based initiative focused on how world building can change the future of storytelling, thus providing an opportunity for fiction to be the testing ground for reality within the World Building Media Lab's Rilao project. The Institute has a strong presence in Europe. Since 2008 Juan Diaz Bohorquez has been the European Director of the World Building Institute. For the past 14 years Juan Diaz Bohorquez has closely collaborated with Alex McDowell in creating, developing and advancing their world building methods and narrative system. For the past decade the World Building Institute has hosted workshops at the Berlin Film Festival, at the Berlinale Talents.

Awards
In 2002, he won a San Diego Film Critics Society award in the Best Production Design category for his work on Minority Report and, in 2004, an Art Directors Guild award for Excellence in Production Design for The Terminal. In 2006, McDowell was named Royal Designer for Industry by the RSA, the UK's most prestigious design society, and was appointed Visiting Artist at the MIT Media Lab.

References

External links
Official website
University of Southern California Faculty Page
World Building Institute
World Building Media Lab
5D GlobalStudio

The Terminal Diary

1955 births
British film designers
Living people
Malaysian people of English descent
Alumni of the Central School of Art and Design